Helgi Jónsson (11 April 1867, Rangárvallasýsla – 1925) was an Icelandic botanist and phycologist.

He specialized in the research of marine algae and subarctic vegetation. During his career, he undertook many botanical trips throughout Iceland.

Main works
 The marine algae of Iceland. Botanisk Tidsskrift 25: 378–380. 1902–1903.
 The marine algae of East Greenland. Meddelelser om Grønland 30: 1-73. 1904.
  The marine algal vegetation of Iceland. The Botany of Iceland, edited by L. Kolderup Rosenvinge & E. Warming, J. Frimodt, Copenhagen, and John Wheldon and Co., London; Vol. 1, Part 1, pp. 1–186. 1912.

The diatom Navicula jonssonii Østrup is named for him.

References

Helgi Jonsson
1867 births
1925 deaths
Phycologists